Ethmia johnpringlei is a moth in the family Depressariidae. The habitat consists of dry forests and rain forests.

The ground color of the forewings is grayish with a series of elongated dark markings, the most conspicuous being an oblique line originating at the costa before the middle reaching a longitudinal line that runs from the middle to near the termen. There are three irregular black dots on the posterior half. The hindwing ground color is white.

Etymology
The species is named in honor of John Pringle, a member of the small group of academic faculty who have supported Area de Conservación Guanacaste's land purchase for permanent conservation.

References

Moths described in 2014
johnpringlei